The Nord Aviation 3202 was a 1950s French military trainer aircraft designed and built by Nord Aviation to meet a French Army requirement for a two-seat basic trainer, as a replacement for the biplane Stampe SV.4. Altogether, 101 examples were built, with the first flying on 17 April 1957.

Design
The 3202 was a cantilever low-wing monoplane with a fixed tailwheel landing gear and a nose-mounted inline piston engine. It had an enclosed cockpit for pupil (front) and instructor (rear) in tandem.

Operation

The Nord 3202 was used as a military training aircraft.  After retirement from military use, many examples were sold to the civilian market, including several now (2012) flown in the United States.

Variants
Nord 3200
Prototype with a 240hp (179kW) Salmson 8AS-04 engine.
Nord 3201
Prototype with a 170hp (127kW) Regnier 4L-22 engine.
Nord 3202
Production aircraft with a  Potez 4D-32 engine, 50 built.
Nord 3202B
Production aircraft with a  Potez 4D-34 engine, 50 built.
Nord 3202B1B
modified by Aérospatiale for use by the Patrouille de l'Aviation Légère de l'Armée de Terre in aerobatic competitions. Larger ailerons, lower weight, new landing gear, and variable-pitch propeller.
Nord 3212
Redesignation for 3202s fitted with radio compass and equipped for instrument flight training.

Operators

French Army

Specifications (N 3202)

See also

References

Further reading

External links

 Aviafrance

3202
1950s French military trainer aircraft
Single-engined tractor aircraft
Low-wing aircraft
Aircraft first flown in 1957